The Red Tent was the tent in which survivors of the airship Italy took shelter after it fell onto the ice pack in the Arctic at around 10:33 on 25 May 1928, until the time of their rescue on 12 July by the  Soviet ice breaker Krasin.

History 
The Red Curtain was designed by the engineer Felice Trojani, among the emergency equipments for the crew members who were about to get off the aerial view on the North Pole; of the equipment was also part of the Ondina 33 radio, through which the Marconist Giuseppe Biagi was able to launch the SOS first and then to lead the rescue to the survivors. The tent design was preceded by an accurate study of those used in previous polar expeditions, and was carried out by Moretti Company in Milan.

The Red Curtain was of a central type, with a parallelepipedal base of 2.75 × 2.75 m for 1 m high, overlaid with a pyramidal part whose vertex was nearly 1 m from the ground. The access was secured through a circular entrance of one meter in diameter and closed by a windshield sleeve. The exterior walls and the bottom were in crude silk, not colored, while the inner walls were blue silk; The color was chosen as palliative against the snow ophthalmic.

The tent, designed to accommodate up to four people, hosted nine (including two leg wounds, Umberto Nobile and Natale Cecioni), Titina's mascot, a part of the radio and the batteries that fed it. Once the curtain was recovered between the materials scattered on the pack, it was lifted by Trojani, while Mariano and Viglieri planted the picks in the ice and tensed the winds, loading the edges with recovered food and other weights. At the bottom were placed the cartons containing the sailing cards and the only surviving sleeping bag that, cut and opened, would host the two wounded Cecioni and Nobile, next to the catalytic stove on.

To properly assess the height of the airship relative to the ground, were not sufficiently reliable altimeters available at the time, and was therefore used a more efficient system: from the cabin of the airship were dropped the vials of glass, stuffed with fuchsin, by measuring the time of a fall with a special stopwatch, made in Rome by Hausmann, starting from the release until the vial collapsed, packing red.

In order to make the tent visible from above, the survivors decided to use the fallen firecracker vials to draw a line of red lines. Once communications were established through the radio, the rescuers became aware of the new color, and the journalists coined the name "Red Curtain". The continual and aggressive light of the Nordic summer made the delicate aniline vanish in just a few days, bringing the tent to its original livery.

The Red Curtain was retrieved, along with Einar Lundborg's airplane and all the field materials, from the Krasin crew. Upon returning to Italy, Umberto Nobile donated the Red Curtain to the City of Milan, the sponsor of the polar expedition, who dedicated it to the Museum of the Castello Sforzesco, today the National Museum of Science and Technology Leonardo da Vinci, where Felice Trojani mounted it for the last time. The Red Curtain was exposed to the public until the mid -nineties, and is now waiting for a long and delicate restoration that once again allows its public exposure.

References 
 Happy Trojani, The Tail of Minosse: A Man's Life, a Business History , IX Edition, Milan 2007, Ugo Mursia.
 Happy Trojani, Last Flight , IV Edition, Milan 2008, Ugo Mursia.

Tents